Federal Route 79, or Jalan Ulu Pauh–Padang Besar, is a federal road in Perlis, Malaysia. The 28.5 km (17.7 mile) road connects Padang Besar in the north to Ulu Pauh in the south.

Route background
The Kilometre Zero of the Federal Route 79 starts at Ulu Pauh.

Features
 The Chuping sugarcane plantation, the largest in Malaysia.
 FELDA Chuping

At most sections, the Federal Route 79 was built under the JKR R5 road standard, allowing maximum speed limit of up to 90 km/h.

List of junctions

References

Malaysian Federal Roads
Roads in Perlis